Nancy Chiles Dix is a former member of the Ohio Senate, where she served the 31st District from 1994 to 1998.

External links
Profile on the Ohio Ladies Gallery website

References

Republican Party Ohio state senators
Women state legislators in Ohio
Living people
Year of birth missing (living people)
21st-century American women